Blackstarkids, sometimes stylised as BLACKSTARKIDS, is an American hip-hop/pop/indie rock band from Kansas City, Missouri. The band consists of TheBabeGabe, TyFaizon, and Deiondre. They blend the music styles of hip-hop, indie rock and pop. They have been described as 1990s nostalgia reinterpreted for a new generation.

History
The group grew up in Raytown, a suburb just outside Kansas City where they all attended high school. Their members met when they were about 15-16 years old. TyFaizon had been working separately with The Babe Gabe and Deiondre on different projects then subsequently brought the three together to form the Blackstarkids in January 2019.

The roles of the members are fluid, but TyFaizon and The Babe Gabe are the main songwriters with Deiondre acting as producer. They create their works by deciding on an album name and tracklist using a "visual concept", then write the songs to fit the concept. Often using existing songs as references to inspire their songs, such as the riff to Green Day's "Basket Case" leading to their riff-based song "Frankie Muniz".

They formed their own label, Bedroom Records, and released their debut mix-tape 'Let's Play Sports' in 2019 and their follow up 'Surf''' in 2020.  They signed to Matty Healy of The 1975's label Dirty Hit in April 2020, shortly after he highlighted their track "Sounds Like Fun" as one of his new discoveries on Instagram. Their first mix-tape for Dirty Hit Whatever, Man was released in late 2020 and featured a cameo from Matty Healy and label mates beabadoobee on the track "Friendship". The album featured the track "Frankie Muniz" which gained praise on Twitter from the actor with the same name.
They released their album Puppies Forever in October 2021. Although it is their fourth release, they consider it their proper debut album. The album was preceded by three singles, "Juno", "Fight Club," and "All Cops Are Bastards", which demonstrated anger at systemic racism and police brutality.

Due to COVID-19, live performances have been limited to a handful of shows including appearing at Chicago's Riot Fest alongside Devo, Ice-T and The Flaming Lips in September 2021. They will tour with label mates Glass Animals and beabadoobee in fall 2021.

Influences
In keeping with their genre-blurring aesthetic they have named an eclectic range of influences. These include indie rock groups such as Weezer. Nirvana and The Smashing Pumpkins hip hop acts such as A Tribe Called Quest, Tyler the Creator, Odd Future and other acts such as Prince, Mac DeMarco and Toro Y Moi. They also incorporate influences from 2000s pop culture such as Scott Pilgrim vs. the World, Diary of a Wimpy Kid and iCarly amongst others.

DiscographyLet's Play Sports (Bedroom Records, 2019)SURF (Bedroom Records, 2020)Whatever, Man (Dirty Hit, 2020)Puppies Forever (Dirty Hit, 2021)CYBERKISS*'' (Dirty Hit, 2022)

References

African-American musical groups
Musical groups from Kansas City, Missouri
Musical groups established in 2019